PT Bio Farma (Persero) is an Indonesian state-owned enterprise based in Bandung, West Java and the only local vaccine manufacturer in Indonesia,  which produces vaccines and sera to support immunization in Indonesia and other countries. Bio Farma vaccine produced vaccines against measles, polio, hepatitis B, and pentavalent vaccine. Bio Farma has supplied vaccines to multiple countries through UNICEF, PAHO and other organizations. Since 2020, it also serves as the holding company for listed state-owned enterprises Kimia Farma and Indofarma.


History

Bio Farma's history began during the Dutch East Indies period, when the colonial government founded  (State Vaccine Development Agency) on 6 August 1890. The agency occupied a building in Weltevreden – Batavia, which is now Gatot Soebroto Army Hospital. Since its inception,  focused on eliminating infectious diseases, which leads to its cooperation with Pasteur Institute.

During the administration of J.P. van Limburg Stirum, Hendrik Tillema recommended to move the capital of Dutch East Indies to Bandung  due to its natural conditions and hilly terrain, making it easier to defend. The idea was gradually accepted and began to be implemented by the Dutch colonial government in early 1920s after it was supported by Prof. J. Klopper, Rector of Technische Hogeschool te Bandoeng at the time. The agency has experienced several changes in name and legal entity, which are as follows:

 1890-1895    
 1895-1901    
 1902-1941    
 1942-1945    , under Japanese occupation
 1945-1949    , after Indonesian independence. During the independence war, its activities moved to Klaten, Yogyakarta
 1946-1949    Since Bandung is under Dutch control during the independence war, the name of the Bandung facility reverted to 
 1950-1954    , Independence war is over and the agency returned to Bandung
 1955-1960    
 1961-1978    
 1978-1997    
 1997–present

References

External links
 

 
Companies based in Bandung
Pharmaceutical companies of Indonesia
Indonesian brands
Government-owned companies of Indonesia
Vaccine producers
COVID-19 vaccine producers